Vukovi (stylised as VUKOVI) is a Scottish rock band from Kilwinning, North Ayrshire, Scotland. The band released their self-titled debut album Vukovi on 10 Mar 2017. Their second album titled Fall Better was released on 24 January 2020.

History

Wolves 
Reilly, Trotter and Lynch played together in a Scottish rock band called Wolves. As they were unsatisfied with their lead singer, he left the band. At around the same time, Shilstone was fired from another band. When Shilstone auditioned for Wolves in 2010, everyone instantly felt the chemistry at the first glance. Shilstone's arrival affected the sound of Wolves so much, they decided to change their name to Vukovi (which means wolves in Croatian).

Vukovi 
On 10 March 2017, Vukovi released their debut self-titled album.

On 22 November 2018, the band released a statement announcing bassist Jason Trotter leaves the band as he wanted to move on. The band also stated that the separation with Trotter was peaceful and "there is no bad vibes". According to Trotter's Instagram page, he is working as a barber in Glasgow. At around the same time, Irving also left the band for unspecified reasons.

Fall Better 
On 24 January 2020, Vukovi released their second album, Fall Better.

Members

Current members 
 Janine Shilstone - vocals (2010–present)
 Hamish Reilly - lead guitar (2010–present)

Former members 
 Jason Trotter - bass (2010-2018)
 Colin Irving - drums (2012-2018)
 Martin Lynch - drums (2010-2012)

Discography

Studio albums

EPs

Singles

References

External links 
 
 

Musical groups established in 2010
Scottish pop rock music groups
2010 establishments in Scotland
People from Kilwinning
Female-fronted musical groups